Get Over It may refer to:

Albums 
 Get Over It (album), a 2000 album by Mr. Big
 Get Over It (The Nextmen album), a 2003 album by The Nextmen
 Get Over It! (album), a 2009 album by Care Bears on Fire

Songs 
 "Get Over It" (MC Kinky song)
 "Get Over It" (Eagles song)
 "Get Over It" (OK Go song)
 "Get Over It" (Guillemots song)
 "Get Over It" (McBusted song)
 "Get Over It", a song by Avril Lavigne, the B-side of the single "Sk8er Boi"
 "Get Over It", a song by Lower Than Atlantis

Other uses 
 Get Over It (film), a 2001 film starring Kirsten Dunst
 Get Over It!, the 2011 FIRST Tech Challenge game

See also
 Forgiveness
 Getting Over It, a 2017 video game.
 Over It (disambiguation)